The Ishasha is a river in southwest Uganda, forming part of the border with the Democratic Republic of the Congo. It runs from its source north of Kabale to its mouth at Lake Edward. Its length is very roughly  ignoring the many small meanders.

Description
It runs northwest through mountain valleys to its entrance into the northern lobe of Bwindi Impenetrable National Park. From there, it continues northwest under the heavy forest canopy to the Kanungu dam, part of the Kanungu Hydroelectric Power Station, also known as the Ishasha Power Station.

Leaving the power station, it meanders northwest through hilly terrain until it joins and becomes part of the Uganda-Democratic Republic of the Congo (DRC) border. After turning north, it continues past the DRC town of Ishasha at the southern tip of Queen Elizabeth National Park (QENP). It remains the western border of QENP until it enters the marshlands on the shore of Lake Edward.

Location

See also
List of rivers of Uganda
List of rivers of the Democratic Republic of the Congo

References

Rivers of Uganda
Rivers of the Democratic Republic of the Congo
International rivers of Africa
Border rivers
Democratic Republic of the Congo–Uganda border